Hing Wah Estate is a public housing estate in Chai Wan, Hong Kong Island, Hong Kong, near MTR Chai Wan station. The estate comprises 10 residential buildings. The 7 "Old Slab" blocks belong to Hing Wah (II) Estate completed in 1976, while the 3 "Harmony 1" buildings belong to Hing Wah (I) Estate completed in 1999 and 2000.

Background
Hing Wah (I) Estate was a resettlement estate which had 3 resettlement blocks completed in 1971. 7 more "Old Slab" blocks were completed in 1976, which formed Hing Wah (II) Estate. The 3 resettlement blocks in Hing Wah (I) Estate were demolished in 1995, replaced by two rental blocks in 1999 and one HOS block in 2000 respectively. However, the government decided to change an HOS block from sale to rental finally, and renamed it from "Hing Tsui Court" to "Hing Tsui House".

Houses

Hing Wah (I) Estate

Hing Wah (II) Estate

Demographics
According to the 2016 by-census, Hing Wah (I) Estate had a population of 7,526 while Hing Wah (II) Estate had a population of 8,351. Altogether the population amounts to 15,877.

Politics
For the 2019 District Council election, the estate fell within two constituencies. Hing Wah (I) Estate is located in the Hing Man constituency, which is represented by Tse Miu-yee, while Hing Wah (II) Estate falls within the Fei Tsui constituency, which is represented by Joseph Lai Chi-keong.

Covid Pandemic
May Wah House was put under lockdown between 3 and 4 February 2021.

Education
Hing Wah Estate is in Primary One Admission (POA) School Net 16. Within the school net are multiple aided schools (operated independently but funded with government money) and two government schools: Shau Kei Wan Government Primary School and Aldrich Bay Government Primary School.

See also

Public housing estates in Chai Wan and Siu Sai Wan

References

Chai Wan
Public housing estates in Hong Kong
Residential buildings completed in 1976
Residential buildings completed in 1999
Residential buildings completed in 2000